Israel Clement Trihey (June 24, 1897 – February 4, 1973) was a Canadian professional ice hockey player. He played with the Victoria Cougars of the Pacific Coast Hockey Association during the 1923–24 season.

He was a nephew of Hockey Hall of Fame inductee Harry Trihey.

References

1897 births
1973 deaths
Canadian ice hockey players
Ice hockey people from Montreal
Victoria Cougars (1911–1926) players